Keon Hatcher (born September 11, 1994) is an American football wide receiver for the BC Lions of the Canadian Football League (CFL). He first played football at Owasso High School in Oklahoma. He then played college football at Arkansas and signed with the Oakland Raiders as an undrafted free agent in 2017.

Professional career

Oakland Raiders
Hatcher signed with the Oakland Raiders as an undrafted free agent on May 5, 2017. He was waived on September 2, 2017, and was signed to the Raiders' practice squad the next day. He signed a reserve/future contract with the Raiders on January 2, 2018.

After an impressive preseason, Hatcher made the Raiders' initial 53-man roster and made his regular-season debut in Week 1 in a 33–13 loss to the Los Angeles Rams. On September 12, 2018, he was waived by the Raiders.

Detroit Lions
On September 19, 2018, Hatcher was signed to the Detroit Lions' practice squad, but was released the following day.

Green Bay Packers
Hatcher was signed to the Green Bay Packers practice squad on October 9, 2018.

Oakland Raiders (second stint)
On November 19, 2018, Hatcher was signed by the Oakland Raiders off the Packers practice squad. He was waived on August 31, 2019.

Green Bay Packers (second stint)
On September 19, 2019, Hatcher was signed to the Green Bay Packers practice squad. He was released on October 31.

New York Jets
On December 17, 2019, Hatcher was signed to the New York Jets practice squad. He signed a reserve/future contract with the Jets on December 30, 2019. He was waived on May 5, 2020.

Hatcher had a tryout with the Detroit Lions on August 14, 2020.

BC Lions
Hatcher signed with the BC Lions of the CFL on June 9, 2021.  During the 2021 season, Hatcher spent most of the season on the practice roster but did manage to dress for 7 games. After training camp in 2022, Hatcher made the active roster and was a starter as the field wideout for the Lions.

References

External links
Oakland Raiders bio
Arkansas Razorbacks bio

1994 births
Living people
People from Owasso, Oklahoma
Players of American football from Oklahoma
American football wide receivers
Arkansas Razorbacks football players
Oakland Raiders players
Green Bay Packers players
New York Jets players
BC Lions players